Pachysentis is a genus of Acanthocephala (thorny-headed worms, also known as spiny-headed worms) that parasitize carnivourous mammals by attaching themselves to the intestines using their hook-covered proboscis. Their life cycle includes an egg stage found in host feces, a cystacanth (larval) stage in an intermediate host such as the Egyptian cobra, and an adult stage where cystacanths mature in the intestines of the host. This genus appears identical to the closely related Oncicola apart from a greater number of hooks on the proboscis. The eleven species (however, P. septemserialis has an uncertain taxonomic status) in this genus are distributed across Africa and the Americas.

Taxonomy
Phylogenetic analysis has been conducted on one of the eleven species in the genus, P. canicola, using the gene for 18S ribosomal RNA and ITS1-5.8-ITS2 region of ribosomal RNA and confirms that this species forms an independent group in the family Oligacanthorhynchidae. Phylogenetic analyses have also been conducted on Oncicola, a genus morphologically nearly identical to Pachysentis apart from the number of hooks on the proboscis, and have placed it in the family Oligacanthorhynchidae. The type species is P. canicola.

Description

Pachysentis look identical to the closely related Oncicola apart from the number of hooks on the proboscis. Species of Oncicola have 36 or less hooks whereas species of Pachysentis have more. The proboscis of Pachysentis species are not quite spherical and contains 42 to 102 hooks arranged into 12 longitudinal rows 3 to 12 hooks each. The rows may be regularly or irregularly alternating and straight or crooked. Hooks have tips with or without barbs, and the larger hooks with complex manubria and roots with the remaining spines being rootless. The trunk is fairly wide relative to the length with the anterior half usually wider than the posterior half. The testes are in tandem with at least one located before the middle of the worm. There are eight cement glands compactly arranged each with single giant nucleus used to temporarily close the posterior end of the female after copulation. The eggs have a sculptured outer membrane. Species can be distinguished based on the number and arrangements of proboscis hooks, whether these hooks are barbed, the arrangement of the cement glands, host, and the length of lemnisci.

Species
The genus Pachysentis Meyer, 1931 contains eleven species, however P. septemserialis has an uncertain taxonomic status.

Pachysentis angolensis (Golvan, 1957)

P. angolensis was found infesting the Side-striped jackal (Canis adustus). This species is named after Angola, the site where it was first discovered. The proboscis has a total of 42 hooks without barbs in 12 regularly alternating rows of three and four hooks (six rows of each). The eight cement glands are organized in pairs.

Pachysentis canicola Meyer, 1931

P. canicola was found infesting the Red fox (Vulpes vulpes) in Bushehr, Bushehr Province, Iran, P. canicola was also found infesting the golden jackal, (Canis aureus) in Iran. It was also found infesting the Western diamondback rattlesnake. It was also found infesting the maned wolf (Chrysocyon brachyurus) and the striped skunk, (Mephitis mephitis) in Texas. It is the type species of the genus Pachysentis.

Pachysentis dollfusi (Machado-Filho, 1950)

P. dollfusi was found infesting the intestines of the Common brown lemur (Eulemur fulvus) in a Brazilian zoo but originally from the island of Madagascar. It is thus unknown if the worm originates from Brazil or Madagascar. The proboscis has 48 barbed hooks arranged into six rows of four hooks each followed by six rows of four hooks each. The cement glands are in uniform pairs. It is synonymous with Prosthenorchis spirula Travassos 1917. It is named after the parasitologist Robert-Philippe Dollfus.

Pachysentis ehrenbergi Meyer, 1931

P. ehrenbergi was found infesting the red fox (Vulpes vulpes) in Egypt and in an intermediate host the Egyptian cobra (Naja haje). The proboscis is armed with 102 barbed hooks arranged into six rows of nine hooks each followed by six rows of eight hooks each. P. ehrenbergi was reported infesting the body cavity of 5.4% of a sample of African five-lined skinks (Trachylepis quinquetaeniata) in the Qena Governorate of Egypt, however the measurements and morphological description do not match either the original description by Meyer in 1931 or the reexamination of original specimens by Gomes et al. in 2019. Juvenile P. ehrenbergi have been reported infesting the Long-eared hedgehog (Hemiechinus auritus) in the Faran Oasis, South Sinai, Egypt. Juvenline trunk length is reported to be 3.22–4.16mm by 0.87–1.04mm, the proboscis length to be 0.42–0.60mm in length by 0.45–0.68mm in width, the proboscis sheath to be 0.79–1.0mm by 0.37–0.52mm (whereas the measurements given by Meyer in the original 1931 description is larger at 1.3mm in length and the proboscis measuring 0.8mm in length by 0.9mm in width). The anterior proboscis hooks in the juveniles are reported to be large from 0.078–0.086mm long and the posterior hooks smaller from 0.052–0.062mm.

Pachysentis gethi (Machado-Filho, 1950)

P. gethi was originally described in 1950 by Machado-Filho infesting Tayra (Eira barbara) in Pará and Rio de Janeiro, Brazil but this remained the only record until it was rediscovered in 2016 infesting the wild lesser grison (Galictis cuja) also in Rio de Janeiro with different measurements. The proboscis has 42 hooks without barbs arranged into six rows of four hooks followed by six rows of three hooks. The eight cement glands occur in pairs.. The species was named after Dr. Geth Jansen.

Pachysentis lauroi Gomes, Amin, Olifiers, Bianchi, Souza, Barbosa & Maldonado, 2019

P. lauroi has been found infesting the South American coati (Nasua nasua) in Mato Grosso do Sul, Brazil. The proboscis has 48 barbed hooks arranged into six rows of four hooks followed by six rows of four hooks. The eight cement glands are clustered. It was found in the small intestine. The species is named after , a parasitologist who studied Brazilian Acanthocephala.

Pachysentis lenti (Machado-Filho, 1950)

P. lenti has been found infesting the White-headed marmoset (Callithrix geoffroyi) in Espirito Santo, Brazil. The proboscis has 48 hooks without barbs arranged into six rows of four hooks followed by six rows of four hooks. It is named after , a Brazilian parasitologist.

Pachysentis procumbens Meyer, 1931

P. procumbens has been found infesting the red fox (Vulpes vulpes)	in Argo, Egypt. The proboscis has 90 hooks without barbs arranged into six rows of seven hooks followed by six rows of eight hooks. 

Pachysentis procyonis (Machado-Filho, 1950)

P. procyonis was found infesting the intestines Crab-eating raccoon (Procyon cancrivorus) in Rio de Janeiro, Brazil. The proboscis has 42 hooks without barbs arranged into six rows of four hooks followed by six rows of three hooks. Distinguishing features include eight clustered cement glands and very short lemnisci that do not reach the anterior testis. The species was named after the genus of the host it was found, Procyon. It is the only known parasite of the cra-eating racoon in Brazil.

Pachysentis rugosus (Machado-Filho, 1950)

P. rugosus have been found infesting the large intestines of Azaras's capuchin (Sapajus cay) in Rio de Janeiro, Brazil and the Tufted capuchin (Sapajus apella) also in Brazil. The proboscis is armed with 42 hooks without barbs arranged into six rows of four hooks each followed by six rows of three hooks each. This species can be identified by their clustered cement glands and long leminisci that reach the anterior testis. 

Pachysentis septemserialis (Machado-Filho, 1950)

P. septemserialis is considered to have uncertain taxonomic status by Gomes (2019) due to the differences between the paratypes morphological characteristics and those of the original description, the similarity in hosts (primates of the family Callitrichidae including the Black tamarin (Saguinus niger)), and the absence of samples or measurements of adult males. Specifically, the original description of one paratype described the lack of a collar at the base of the proboscis whereas a collar was observed (suggesting affiliation with the genus Prosthenorchis). A second discrepancy from another paratype is the incorrect number of hooks; 12 longitudinal rows of four hooks with total of 48 hooks were observed but contradicts the seven rows of seven hooks with a total of 49 hooks given in the original description. The name septemserialis refers to the seven rows in series. Morphologically, new observations suggests it is synonymous with P. lenti.

Hosts
Pachysentis species exclusively parasitize carnivourous mammals as their primary host. Reptilian intermediate hosts have been found for P. ehrenbergi and P. canicola.

Notes

References

External links
 

Archiacanthocephala
Acanthocephala genera